A radionuclide identification device (RID or RIID) is a small, lightweight, portable gamma-ray spectrometer used for the detection and identification of radioactive substances. It is available from many companies in various forms to provide hand-held gamma-ray  radionuclide identification.  Since these instruments are easily carried, they are suitable for first-line responders in key applications of Homeland Security, Environmental Monitoring and Radiological Mapping.  These devices have also found their usefulness in medical and industrial applications as well as a number of unique applications such as geological surveys.  In the past two decades RIIDs have addressed the growing demand for fast, accurate isotope identification.  These light-weight instruments require room temperature detectors so they can be easily carried and perform meaningful measurements in various environments and locations.

ANSI Requirements 
RIIDs are designed to meet American National Standards Institute (ANSI) requirements, N42.34.  These standards ensure a rugged design including water and shock resistance.  The requirements also include a large gamma energy range, detection of gamma and neutron sources, automatic system calibration and temperature stabilization.  These instruments include a specific ANSI library which contains a list of standard isotopes.  In addition, most RIIDs have a Medical and Industrial library.  Other custom libraries are often added to address specific applications required by some users.

Detectors 
Most RIIDs use scintillation detectors of various types and sizes.  The most common type of detector is Sodium Iodide (NaI(Tl)).  Other detector types with improved resolution, low background and thermal neutron detection are readily available.  Efficient detectors with good resolution are available in sizes up to and exceeding 3x3 inches.  The relative efficiency of germanium detectors (including other types of detectors) can be compared to a 3x3 NaI(Tl) detector as the standard, representing 100% relative efficiency.  This standard measurement is performed with a 60Co source (1332 keV at 25 cm yielding 1.2 cps/KBq).  Various measurements have shown that cerium bromide (CeBr3) has improved efficiency and resolution compared to NaI(Tl) with comparable low background.

History of Neutron Detection  
The discovery of the neutron was paramount to the development of atomic physics in the first half of the twentieth century. The essential nature of the atomic nucleus was established with the discovery of the neutron by James Chadwick in 1932. Detection of the neutron requires a special environment because neutrons do not typically cause ionization since they are not charged particles.  However, if the interaction of the neutron is with a nuclide of high neutron cross-section1 then a response to neutrons becomes probable.  Nuclides commonly used as neutron detector materials are helium-3 (3He), lithium-6 (6Li), boron-10 (10B) and uranium-235 (235U).  The detector material is surrounded by a moderator which reduces the kinetic energy of the neutron (slowing down the neutron).  Moderated neutrons are commonly called thermal neutrons providing a high probability of interaction with the target material.  

The following neutron detectors are discussed as the most common types used today.             

1 The neutron cross-section expresses the likelihood of interaction between an incident neutron and a target nucleus.

Helium-3 (3He) Gas-Filled Proportional Detectors 
3He was first proposed as a neutron detector in 1939.  It was first thought to be a radioactive isotope until samples of natural helium were found (which is mostly helium-4).  Helium is found just below the earth’s crust in a ratio of 300 atoms of 3He per million atoms of 4He.

With no electrical charge, neutron interaction with atomic electrons is not possible (as in X-ray, gamma, electron or beta detectors). Therefore, we rely on interaction with an atomic nucleus.

The n + 3 He reaction is shown below with conservation of energy as:

                                  n + 3He → 3H + p + 764 keV

The energy of 764 keV is the sum of the proton kinetic energy of 573 keV plus the triton (tritium ion) kinetic energy of 191 keV.  This energy (charge) is collected as daughter products yielding an output pulse which is proportional to the 764 keV energy for thermal neutrons. 3He provides an efficient neutron detector when 3He reacts by absorbing thermal neutrons, producing a 1H (proton) and a 3H ion (tritium). Its sensitivity to gamma rays is negligible, providing a very useful neutron detector. Unfortunately, the supply of 3He is limited to production as a byproduct from the decay of tritium (which has a 12.3-year half-life); tritium is produced either as part of weapons programs as a booster for nuclear weapons or as a byproduct of reactor operation.  Therefore, the price of these detectors is somewhat high due to limited availability.

Lithium-6 (6Li) Neutron Detectors 
Scintillating 6Li glass for neutron detection was first reported in 1957.  However, it was not until the early 1990s that major advances were made by Pacific Northwest National Laboratory.  These new techniques were first classified and later declassified in 1994.

The scintillating glass fibers operate by combining 6Li and Cerium ions into the glass composition.  Since 6Li has a high cross-section for thermal neutron absorption this reaction will produce a tritium ion, an alpha particle and kinetic energy. The ionization produced is transferred to the cerium ions which results in an emission of photons with wavelength 390 to 600 nm.  This event results in a flash of light of several thousand photons for each neutron absorbed.  The glass fiber acts as a wave guide for the scintillation light which is coupled to a PMT.  Pulse shape discrimination (PSD) is then used to separate gamma and neutron events.

More recently a similar reaction with 6Li is used for neutron detection in CLYC detectors. The CLYC crystal uses 95% enriched 6Li and doped with cerium ions. This detector produces monoenergetic pulses above 3 MeV for thermal neutrons. This gamma/neutron separation is even further enhanced by PSD and algorithm improvements.  Other detectors like CLLBC are available and offer good gamma resolution and neutron separation up to gamma fields of 20 mR/h and higher.  Some detectors offer fast timing (~60 ns) so that a large dynamic range in counting rates is possible.

Gamma-ray Spectroscopy for Isotope Identification  
Gamma rays were first discovered and studied in 1900 by a French chemist, Paul Villard, while observing radiation from radium. However, the fist quantitative analysis of gamma radiation is credited to Rutherford and Andrade in 1914.  This earliest technique was accomplished by diffraction spectroscopy using a rock-salt crystal.

Crystal diffraction is regarded as an important and pioneering effort in the analysis of gamma-ray energy but falls short of a means to accurately quantify and identify various radionuclides.  Therefore, we must wait several decades later to see achievements leading to what we know as gamma spectroscopy.

Gamma-ray Spectroscopy 
A spectrometer system for radionuclide analysis is composed of a photon detector and associated electronics (e.g., amplifier and pulse shaping) including a means of sorting various energy events and recording/displaying the data.  These events are sorted to produce a spectrum (histogram) displaying intensity (of events) as a function of photon energy.

The advent of the sodium-iodide scintillator  in 1948 and other detectors to follow became useful for spectroscopy.   The photon detector and the Multichannel Pulse-Height Analyzer (MCA) become the primary tools needed to produce a pulse-height spectrum of one or more radionuclides.  It is first necessary to derive a digital number that is proportional to the amplitude of the analog pulse.  This is performed in an Analog-to-Digital Converter (ADC) which is a key part of the MCA. A number of linear and fast ADCs have been developed over the years (e.g., Wilkinson).  One of the first MCAs was developed by Fred Goulding in the 1950s, at the Atomic Energy of Canada, Chalk River facility.  This MCA was called a “Kicksorter” and boasted excellent linearity and 100 channels.  Goulding later worked at the Lawrence Berkeley Lab (1959) and brought some of the early nuclear counting technology to Berkeley and Livermore Labs.  Through later years a number of advances in MCAs have been impressive with 16K channel analyzers being common.  Improvements in nuclear detectors has brought improved energy resolution creating advancements in nuclear science.  In the early 1960s germanium (Ge) detectors were being developed with excellent energy resolution.  This work has continued with emphasis on high purity and larger ingots. Since these detectors are cooled to liquid nitrogen temperatures advancements in room temperature detectors have been necessary for small, portable instruments called Radioisotope Identification Devices (RIIDs).  With newer high-resolution scintillators, RIIDs have become excellent tools for Homeland Security and many other applications requiring spectroscopic identification of radioisotopes.

Berkeley Nucleonic Corporation (BNC) has been a leader in providing RIIDs for two decades.  BNC has implemented a number of techniques to enhance the accuracy, speed and sensitivity needed to quickly identify radioisotopes.  One of these techniques is called Quadratic Compression Conversion (QCC).  QCC is a digital conversion transform used to obtain excellent characterization of spectral peaks.  This allows sensitivity beyond conventional spectroscopy by spreading out tightly spaced low energy peaks and enhancing high energy peaks for faster and easier search of energy lines across the spectrum.  This is especially important for quick indication of highly enriched weapons grade material.  QCC is now incorporated in our new SAM 940+ RIID.  This light-weight, hand-held RIID uses some of the newest high-resolution detectors and the capability of auto updates of new software.

Additional Features 
Some RIIDs have additional features not required by ANSI such as external probes for verification of Special Nuclear Material (SNM).One example is an external Pancake probe used in the detection of alpha and beta radiation.

Another beneficial feature which has existed for about 20 years is Quadratic Compression Conversion (QCC).  This feature adds sensitivity at higher energies for fast and improved verification of weapons grade material.  QCC is also beneficial at lower energies where closely spaced energy lines need sufficient separation to gain improved quantification across the whole energy spectrum.
One of the newer and very effective additions is a one click Reach-Back feature which automatically sends data files (including pictures and videos) to any Reach-Back center.

References

 IEC 62327:2006 – Radiation protection instrumentation – Hand-held instruments for the detection and identification of radionuclides and for the indication of ambient dose equivalent rate from photon radiation.
 R. Arlt et al., Semi-empirical approach for performance evaluation of radionuclide identifiers, Nuclear Science Symposium Conference Record (NSS/MIC), 2009 IEEE

External links
 US NRC short description of RIDs/RIIDs

Ionising radiation detectors